The 2021–22 season was the 35th season for FC Barcelona Femení. In addition to the domestic league, Barcelona played in that season's editions of the Copa de la Reina and UEFA Women's Champions League. Barcelona were coming off a successful 2020–21 campaign by being the first Spanish women's club to win the continental treble after winning the league, UEFA Women's Champions League, and Copa de la Reina. Grant Wahl has called the side one of the best women's club teams in history. 

Barcelona finished the season winning the domestic treble with a 100% win rate in 36 matches across all domestic competitions (league, cup, super cup), scoring 183 goals and conceding only 13 goals with a goal difference of +170. 

Overall Barcelona won 45 of the 47 matches played across all competitions, scoring 221 goals and conceding 23 with a goal difference of +198. They lost only twice, both of which came in consecutive matches in the UEFA Women's Champions League knockout stages, losing 0–2 against Wolfsburg in the second leg of the semi-finals, but winning 5–3 on aggregate and getting through to the final.

In the final, Barcelona were defeated 1–3 by Lyon, with the team's only goal being scored by the captain Alexia Putellas. The team finished the season with a 96% win rate across all competitions along with a record 45-match winning streak that lasted from the first match of the season until the defeat against Wolfsburg in the UEFA Women's Champions League semi-finals second leg.

Kits

Players

Current squad

FC Barcelona Femení B

Transfers

In

Out

Competitions

Overall record

Pre-season and Friendlies 
Barcelona opened the pre-season with a Joan Gamper Trophy victory against Italian champions Juventus. They travelled to the United States for the 2021 Women's International Champions Cup to face French Division 1 Féminine Lyon and NWSL side Houston Dash at Providence Park in Portland. Barcelona finished third in the summer friendly tournament.

Primera División

League table

Results summary

Results by round

Matches

Copa de la Reina 

Barcelona entered at the Round of 16 after the draw on 11 February 2022. The team started their Cup defense in Madrid versus Rayo Vallecano with a 3–1 victory. Their next match was a 3–0 win against Real Sociedad. The team then defeated Real Madrid in the semi-finals, winning for the sixth time out of the six games played between them this season. 

In the final, Barcelona easily demolished Sporting de Huelva with a 6-1 win, which won them the domestic treble with a 100% win rate in all domestic competitions (league, cup, super cup).

Supercopa de España Femenina 

Barcelona faced Real Madrid in the first semi-final, edging out a 1–0 win with a goal by Alexia in the dying minutes of the game. The team then easily dispatched Atlético Madrid with a 7–0 thumping in the Final. Barcelona secured their second Supercopa de España Femenina held at La Ciudad del Fútbol in Las Rozas de Madrid.

UEFA Women's Champions League

Group stage 

The Group Stage draw was completed on 13 September 2021, and Barcelona started its title defense against English club Arsenal. They were also drawn with German outfit TSG 1899 Hoffenheim and Danish champions Køge. Barcelona completed the Group Stage undefeated with 24 goals scored while only giving up one goal.

Knockout phase 

Barcelona held the quarter-final, 2nd leg, against El Clásico rival Real Madrid at Camp Nou, the home team's second competitive match at the stadium and the first in front of fans. Barcelona advanced to the semi-final with an 8–3 aggregate score, winning both matches in the tie. Barcelona's attendances in their home quarter- and semi-finals (91,553 and 91,648) were the largest known attendances for women's football matches in the world since 1971, Mexico–Denmark (110,000), at the Azteca Stadium. Barcelona beat Wolfsburg 5–1 in the semi-final, 1st leg.

Quarter-finals

Semi-finals

Final

Statistics

Overall

Assists

References 

FC Barcelona Femení seasons
2021–22 in Spanish women's football
Spanish football clubs 2021–22 season